Manuel Camper (born May 18, 1999) is an American professional basketball player for the Grand Rapids Gold of the NBA G League. He played college basketball for the Siena Saints.

High school career
Camper attended Kent County High School, where he played quarterback and wide receiver as well as basketball. He scored 1,951 points in his high school career. As a senior, Camper averaged 28 points and 13 rebounds per game and led the Trojans to the Maryland 1A east region title. He was twice named Bayside North Player of the Year.

College career
Camper rarely played as a freshman and averaged 6.4 points and 5.4 rebounds per game as a sophomore. He spent the offseason reworking his shot. He averaged 13.7 points and 10.4 rebounds per game as a junior. Camper was named to the First Team All-MAAC. Following the season, he declared for the 2020 NBA draft but opted to return. He earned MAAC Player of the Week honors on January 11, 2021 and March 1, 2021. At the close of the 2020–21 regular season, Camper was named the MAAC Player of the Year. He averaged 14.1 points, 9.7 rebounds and 3.6 assists per game. Following the season, Camper declared for the 2021 NBA draft, forgoing the additional year of eligibility the NCAA granted players due to the COVID-19 pandemic.

Professional career

Grand Rapids Gold (2021–2022)
After going undrafted in the 2021 NBA draft Camper joined the Grand Rapids Gold after a successful tryout in October 2021.

Cariduros de Fajardo (2022)
On April 12, 2022, Camper signed with the Cariduros de Fajardo of the BSN.

Return to Grand Rapids (2022–present)
On November 4, 2022, Camper was named to the opening night roster for the Grand Rapids Gold.

Career statistics

College

|-
| style="text-align:left;"| 2017–18
| style="text-align:left;"| Siena
| 16 || 2 || 6.8 || .588 || .500 || .611 || 1.2 || .1 || .3 || .1 || 2.0
|-
| style="text-align:left;"| 2018–19
| style="text-align:left;"| Siena
| 29 || 22 || 26.1 || .486 || .133 || .522 || 5.4 || 1.3 || .8 || .3 || 6.4
|-
| style="text-align:left;"| 2019–20
| style="text-align:left;"| Siena
| 30 || 30 || 36.1 || .480 || .333 || .654 || 10.4 || 2.4 || .9 || .3 || 13.7
|-
| style="text-align:left;"| 2020–21
| style="text-align:left;"| Siena
| 17 || 17 || 37.9 || .395 || .304 || .582 || 9.7 || 3.6 || 1.2 || .2 || 14.1
|- class="sortbottom"
| style="text-align:center;" colspan="2"| Career
| 92 || 71 || 28.2 || .457 || .276 || .604 || 7.1 || 1.9 || .8 || .3 || 9.4

References

External links
Siena Saints bio

1999 births
Living people
American men's basketball players
Basketball players from Maryland
Grand Rapids Gold players
People from Chestertown, Maryland
Shooting guards
Siena Saints men's basketball players
Small forwards